Native American tribes in Massachusetts are the Native American tribes and their reservations that existed historically and those that still exist today in what is now the Commonwealth of Massachusetts. A Narragansett term for this region is Ninnimissinuok.

Federally recognized tribes 

Massachusetts has two federally recognized tribes. They have met the seven criteria of an American Indian tribe: being an American Indian entity since at least 1900, a predominant part of the group forms a distinct community and has done so throughout history into the present; holding political influence over its members, having governing documents including membership criteria, members having ancestral descent from historic American Indian tribes, not being members of other existing federally recognized tribes, and not being previously terminated by the U.S. Congress.
 Mashpee Wampanoag Tribe
 Wampanoag Tribe of Gay Head (Aquinnah)

State-recognized tribes 
State-recognized tribes do not have government-to-government relationships with the United States federal government that federally recognized tribes do. The state has developed a formal process for state recognition, and Massachusetts has one state-recognized tribe. 
 Nipmuc Nation

The Nipmuc Nation was formally recognized through an executive order by Governor Michael Dukakis in 1976.

American Indian reservations
These are four Indian Reservations in Massachusetts.
 Chaubunagungamaug, Worcester County
 Hassanamesit, Worcester County
 Mashpee Wampanoag, reservation land in Mashpee (Barnstable County) and Taunton (Bristol County)
 Gay Head (Aquinnah), Dukes County, Martha’s Vineyard)

Historical tribes of Massachusetts 

These are some of the tribes that have existed in what is now Massachusetts. Most no longer exist as functioning American Indian tribes within the state; however, some are tribes in other states or in Canada.
 Mahican tribe, from New York but some migrated to Massachusetts in the late 17th century
Wiekagjoc
Mechkentowoon
Wyachtonoc
Westenhuck (Stockbridge), descendants are members of the Stockbridge–Munsee Community in Wisconsin
Massachusett, Massachusett Bay
Nauset tribe, also known as Cape Indians, Cape Cod
Nipmuc, central plateau
Nipmuc Nation, state-recognized tribe represents them today
Monashackotoog, historic band
Wunnashowatuckoog, Worcester County, historic band
Pennacook tribe, northeastern Massachusetts and southern New Hampshire, descendants may be part of the Odanak First Nation in Quebec, Canada. Other descendants moved to the praying towns of Wamesit and Natick.
Agawam
Nashua
Naumkeag
Pawtucket, merged into the Pennacook
Pentucket
Wachuset
Wamesit
Weshacum
Pocomtuc tribe, also Deerfield Indians, western Massachusetts
Wampanoag tribe, Rhode Island to south edge of Massachusetts Bay
 Mashpee Wampanoag Tribe, active federally-recognized tribe
 Wampanoag Tribe of Gay Head (Aquinnah), active federally-recognized tribe
 Patuxet, Plymouth, historic band

Cultural heritage groups 
More than 20 organizations claim to represent historic tribes within Massachusetts; however, these groups are unrecognized, meaning they do not meet the minimum criteria of a federally recognized tribe or a state-recognized tribe.

See also
 :Category:Native American tribes in Massachusetts
 List of U.S. communities with Native American majority populations
 Indigenous peoples of the Northeastern Woodlands
 North American Indian Center of Boston
 Praying towns

References 

 
Massachusetts
 
Indian
Reservations in Massachusetts